The Hunchback is an epithet applied to:

 Adam de la Halle (1240–1287), French poet, composer and musician
 Alfonso Fróilaz, briefly the king of the unified kingdom of Asturias, Galicia and León in 925
 Godfrey IV, Duke of Lower Lorraine (died 1076)
 Inge I of Norway (1135–1161), a king of Norway
 John the Hunchback, Byzantine general and politician
 Konrad II the Hunchback (1252/65–1304), Duke of Ścinawa, patriarch of Aquileia and Duke of Żagań
 Louis VIII, Duke of Bavaria (1403–1445)
 Mahmud I (1696–1754), Sultan of the Ottoman Empire
 Pepin the Hunchback (c. 768/769–811), Frankish prince, eldest son of Charlemagne
 Robert de Beaumont, 2nd Earl of Leicester (1104–1168)
 Władysław the Hunchback (c. 1303/1305–1351/1352), Polish prince

See also
 Alasdair Crotach MacLeod (1450–1547), Scottish chief of Clan MacLeod, Crotach being Scottish Gaelic for "hunchbacked"

Lists of people by epithet